Cleomenes may refer to:
 one of several kings of Sparta:
 Cleomenes I (c. 520 – c. 490 BC)
 Cleomenes II (370–309 BC)
 Cleomenes III (236–219 BC)
 Cleomenes of Naucratis (died 322 BC), Greek administrator
 Cleomenes the Cynic (c. 300 BC), Cynic philosopher
 Cleomenes (seer), seer in the service of Alexander the Great
 Cleomenes, the Spartan Hero (1692), a play written by John Dryden on the life of Cleomenes III